Mir Mosharraf Hossain (1847–1912) was a Bengali writer, novelist, playwright and essayist. He is considered to be the first major writer to emerge from the Muslim society of Bengal, and one of the finest prose writers in the Bengali language. His magnum opus Bishad Sindhu (Ocean of Sorrow) is a popular classic among the Bengali readership.

Early life
Mir Mosharraf Hossain was born in the village of Lahinipara in Kumarkhali Thana under Kushtia District. He spent most of his life at his ancestral Padamdi Nawab Estate in Baliakandi in erstwhile district of Faridpur (now part of Rajbari District). His widely accepted date of birth is 13 November 1847. But some researchers also claim his date of birth is 26 October 1847. His father was Nawab Syed Mir Moazzem Hossain, a Muslim aristocrat and the Zamindar of the Padamdi Nawab Estate. His mother was called Daulatunnesa Begum.

Mosharraf Hossain learned Arabic and Persian with a teacher at home and then Bengali at a pathshala. He began his formal education at Kushtia School and then studied up to Class V at Krishnanagar Collegiate School. He was admitted to Kalighat School in Kolkata but could not complete his studies. Mosharraf Hossain began his career looking after his father's landed property. Later he served the Faridpur Padamdi Nawab Estate with relative Mir Nadir Hossain grandfather of Mir Tajrul Hossain whose son is Mir Muqtadir Hossain and, in 1885, the Delduar Zamindari Estate. He lived in Kolkata from 1903 to 1909.

Career
While still a student, Mosharraf Hossain worked as a mofussil reporter for the Sangbad Prabhakar (1831) and Gram Barta Prokashika (1863). His literary career started here.

Literary career 
Syed Mir Mosharraf Hossain's magnum opus is Bishad Shindhu, depicting the tale of martyrdom of Hasan and Husayn in Karbala. He was one of the first Muslim writers to emerge from colonial British India. His other works include Jamidar Darpan (Reflections on Zamindars), a play on the plight of common people under the Zamindars (landlords installed by the British colonial government) and their struggle against them.

His literary works were included in the curriculum of school level, secondary, higher secondary and graduation level Bengali Literature in Bangladesh. Mir Mosharraf Hossain wrote his 'Jamidar Darpan' about the background of the peasant uprising against the landlords in Sirajganj 1872–73.  He had always shown an active interest in the everyday life of his fellow countrymen. He assisted Rowshan Ali Chowdhury in publishing The Kohinoor monthly.

Personal life 
In 1865 he married Aziz-un-Nesa. His second wife was Bibi Kulsum married in 1874. He died on 19 December 1911.

Works

Novel

 Ratnawati (1869)
 Bishad Shindhu (1885–1890) Also translated into English and published in 2018

Drama

 Basantakumari (1873)
 Jamidar Darpan (1873)
 Behula Gitavinoya (1889)
 Niyoti Ki Abonoti (1898)
Gazi miar Bostani

Poetry

 Gorai Bridge or Gouri Setu (1873)

Essay

 Gojibon

Autobiographical

 Amar Jiboni (autobiography)
 Bibi Kulsum

Others 

 Gazi Miar Bostani
 Bajimat
 Bibi Khodejar Bibaho
 Hazrart Umarer Dharmo Jibon Labh
 Musolmaner Bangla Shikhya-1
 Musolmaner Bangla Shikhya-2

References

External links
 
 

Bengali writers
Bengali-language writers
Bengali novelists
Bengali Muslims
1847 births
1912 deaths
20th-century Indian Muslims
20th-century Bengalis
19th-century Bengalis
19th-century Indian Muslims
People from Kushtia District